Chanterelle is a commune in the Cantal department in south-central France.

Geography
The river Rhue flows southwest through the western part of the commune.

Population

See also
Communes of the Cantal department

References

Communes of Cantal